The 2021–22 UC Santa Barbara Gauchos men's basketball team represented the University of California, Santa Barbara in the 2021–22 NCAA Division I men's basketball season. The Gauchos, led by fifth-year head coach Joe Pasternack, played their home games at The Thunderdome in Santa Barbara, California as members of the Big West Conference. They finished the season 17–11, 8–5 in Big West play to finish in fifth place. They defeated UC Irvine in the quarterfinals of the Big West tournament before losing to Long Beach State in the semifinals.

Previous season
In a season limited due to the ongoing COVID-19 pandemic, the Gauchos finished the season 22–5, 13–3 in Big West play to win the Big West regular season championship. They defeated Long Beach State, UC Davis, and UC Irvine to win the Big West tournament. As a result, they received the conference's automatic bid to the NCAA tournament as the No. 12 seed in the West region. There they lost in the first round to Creighton.

Roster

Schedule and results 

|-
!colspan=12 style=| Non-conference regular season

|-
!colspan=9 style=| Big West regular season

|-
!colspan=12 style=| Big West tournament

|-
|-

Source

References

UC Santa Barbara Gauchos men's basketball seasons
UC Santa Barbara Gauchos
UC Santa Barbara Gauchos men's basketball
UC Santa Barbara Gauchos men's basketball